Speke's pectinator (Pectinator spekei) or Speke's gundi, is a species of rodent in the family Ctenodactylidae. It is monotypic within the genus Pectinator. It is found in Djibouti, Eritrea, Ethiopia, and Somalia. Its natural habitats are subtropical or tropical dry shrubland, subtropical or tropical dry lowland grassland, and rocky areas.

References 

 Coetzee, N. & Grubb, P. 2004. Pectinator spekei. 2006 IUCN Red List of Threatened Species. Downloaded on 30 July 2007.
 Dieterlen, F. 2005. Family Ctenodactylidae pp. 1536-1537 in D. E. Wilson and M. A. Reeder, eds. Mammal Species of the World, 3rd edition, p. 1536.

Speke's pectinator
Mammals of Djibouti
Mammals of Eritrea
Mammals of Ethiopia
Mammals of Somalia
Fauna of the Horn of Africa
Speke's pectinator
Taxonomy articles created by Polbot
Taxa named by Edward Blyth